Cyperus crypsoides is a species of sedge that is native to Sulawesi.

See also 
 List of Cyperus species

References 

crypsoides
Plants described in 1952
Flora of Sulawesi
Taxa named by Johannes Hendrikus Kern